The 2021–22 Louisville Cardinals women's basketball team represented the University of Louisville during the 2021–22 NCAA Division I women's basketball season. The Cardinals, were led by 15th-year head coach Jeff Walz, and played their home games at the KFC Yum! Center in their eight year in the Atlantic Coast Conference.

They finished the season 29–5 overall and 16–2 in ACC play to finish in second place.  As the second seed in the ACC tournament, they were upset by seventh seed Miami in the Quarterfinals.  They received and at-large bid to the NCAA tournament and were the first seed in the Wichita Regional.  They defeated sixteenth seed Albany in the First Round, ninth seed Gonzaga in the Second Round, fourth seed Tennessee in the Sweet Sixteen, and third seed Michigan in the Elite Eight before falling to eventual champions, and first seed South Carolina in the Final Four.  This was the Cardinals fourth appearance in the Final Four in program history.

Previous season

The Cardinals finished the season 26–4 and 14–2 in ACC play to finish in first place. In the ACC tournament, they defeated Wake Forest in the Quarterfinals and Syracuse before losing in the Final NC State.  They received an at-large bid to the NCAA tournament where they were the two seed in the Alamo Regional.  In the tournament they defeated fifteen seed  in the First Round, seven seed Northwestern in the Second Round, and six seed Oregon in the Sweet Sixteen before losing to one seed and eventual champions  Stanford in the Elite Eight to end their season.

Off-season

Departures

Incoming transfers

Recruiting Class

Source:

Roster

Schedule and results

Source

|-
!colspan=6 style=| Exhibition

|-
!colspan=6 style=| Non-Conference Regular season

|-
!colspan=6 style=| ACC Regular season

|-
!colspan=6 style=| ACC Women's Tournament

|-
!colspan=6 style=| NCAA tournament

Rankings

References

Louisville Cardinals women's basketball seasons
Louisville
Louisville Cardinals women's basketball, 2020-21
Louisville Cardinals women's basketball, 2020-21
Louisville
NCAA Division I women's basketball tournament Final Four seasons